Zemiropsis pintado is a species of sea snail, a marine gastropod mollusk, in the family Babyloniidae.

References

pintado
Gastropods described in 1971